Evangelical Baptist Church may refer to:

 Evangelical Baptist Church (Laconia, New Hampshire), United States
 Evangelical Baptist Church (Newton, Massachusetts), United States
 Evangelical Baptist Church of the Central African Republic
 Evangelical Baptist Church of Korea
 General Conference of the Evangelical Baptist Church